The Delta 2000 series was an American expendable launch system which was used to conduct forty-four orbital launches between 1974 and 1981. It was a member of the Delta family of rockets. Several variants existed, which were differentiated by a four digit numerical code. The Delta 1000, 2000 and 3000 series used surplus NASA Apollo program rockets engines for its first and second stages.

The first stage was an Extended Long Tank Thor, re-engined with the Rocketdyne RS-27 replacing the earlier MB-3-III engine. The RS-27 engine was a rebranded H-1 engine used in the Saturn 1B with minor changes. Three or nine Castor-2 solid rocket boosters were attached to increase thrust at lift-off. The Delta-P second stage used the TRW TR-201 engine. The TR-201 engine was a Lunar Module Descent Engine reconfigured for fixed thrust output. Launches which required a three-stage configuration in order to reach higher orbits used the Thiokol Star-37D or Star-37E upper stage as an apogee kick motor.

Delta 2000 launches occurred from Space Launch Complex 2W at Vandenberg AFB and both pads of Launch Complex 17 at Cape Canaveral. Forty-three out of forty-four launches were successful. The single failure being the maiden flight, 19 January 1974, which placed Skynet 2A into a useless orbit. A short circuit in an electronics package circuit board (on second stage) left the upper stages and satellite in an unstable low orbit (96 x 3,406 km x 37.6°) that rapidly decayed. An investigation revealed that a substandard coating had been used on the circuit board.

The cost of each launch was estimated on average at $28.52 million, depending on the combination of carrier rocket.

References 

 
 

Delta (rocket family)